Sidney Wagner may refer to:

Sidney Wagner (cinematographer)
Sid Wagner, American football player